Ana Carolina Itzaina (born 14 May 1979) is a Uruguayan former diver. She competed in the women's 10 metre platform event at the 1996 Summer Olympics.

References

External links
 

1979 births
Living people
Uruguayan female divers
Olympic divers of Uruguay
Divers at the 1996 Summer Olympics
Place of birth missing (living people)
20th-century Uruguayan women
21st-century Uruguayan women